= Naheed Farid =

Afghan politician

Naheed A. Farid
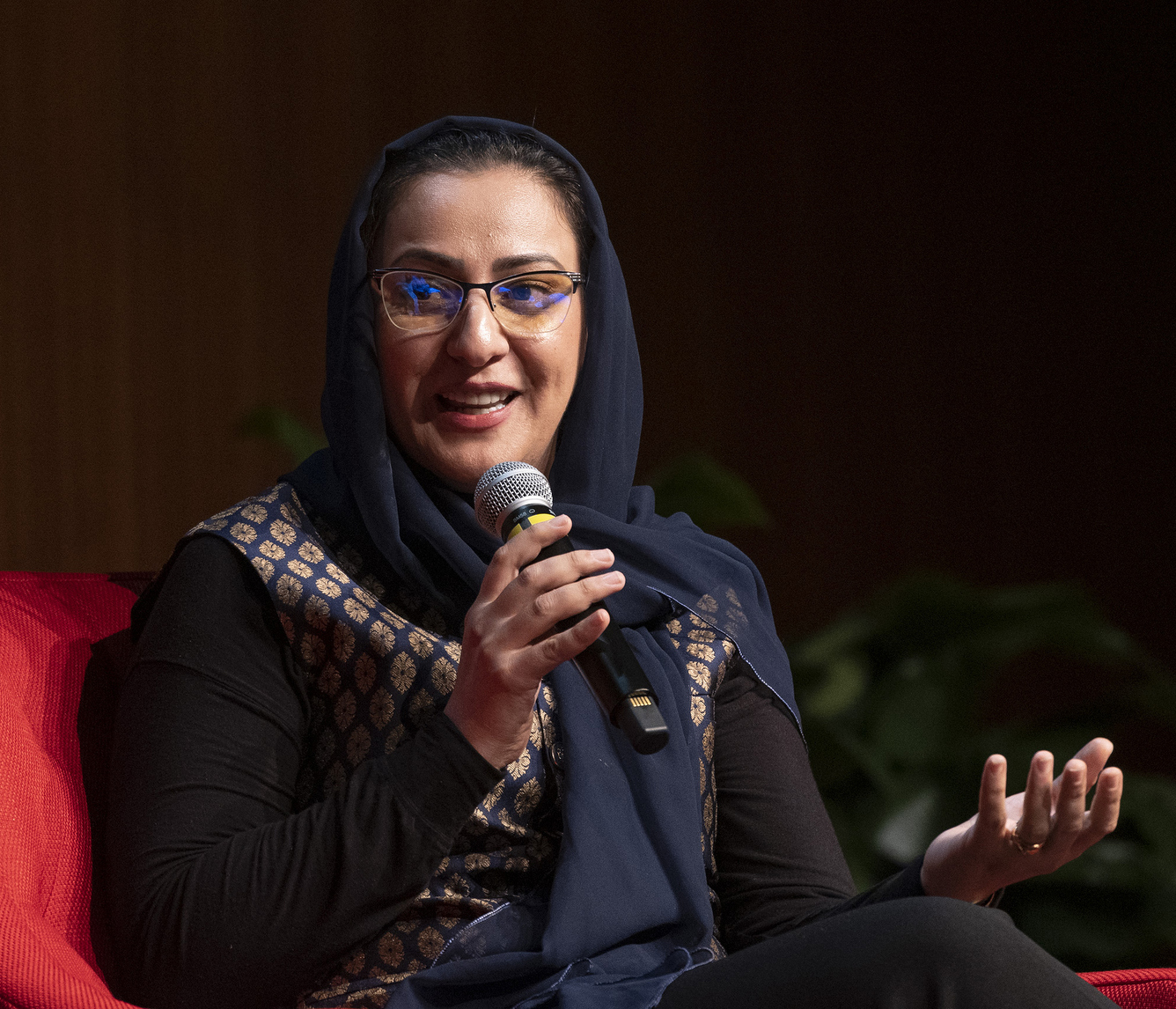
- Farid in 2022

Naheed Farid is an Afghan politician. She was the youngest member of the Afghan parliament. Fearing for her life, she fled Afghanistan after the Afghan government fell and the Taliban seized control.
